Cyrtandra yaeyamae is a species of flowering plant in the family Gesneriaceae, native to Iriomote Island in Japan, and Batan Island in the Philippines. It is very similar in appearance to Cyrtandra cumingii.

References

yaeyamae
Flora of the Ryukyu Islands
Flora of the Philippines
Plants described in 1937